Penicillium radicicola is a species of fungus in the genus Penicillium which produces Roquefortine C and occurs on onions.

References

radicicola
Fungi described in 2003